The year 1877 in science and technology involved some significant events, listed below.

Events
 June 19 – Eadweard Muybridge successfully produces a fast-motion sequence of photographs showing a horse in movement, Sallie Gardner at a Gallop, using multiple cameras at Palo Alto, California, demonstrating that a running horse has all four legs lifted off the ground at once. The sequence could be run on a Zoopraxiscope.

Astronomy
 August 12 – American astronomer Asaph Hall discovers Deimos, the smaller of the two moons of Mars. On August 18, he discovers the larger, Phobos.

Cartography
 Peirce quincuncial projection devised by Charles Sanders Peirce.

Chemistry
 Ludwig Boltzmann establishes statistical derivations of many important physical and chemical concepts, including entropy, and distributions of molecular velocities in the gas phase.

Earth sciences
 June 26 – Volcanic eruption of Cotopaxi in Ecuador.

History of science
 Dr. August Eisenlohr publishes the first translation and study of the Rhind Mathematical Papyrus.
 American railroad lawyer and ethnologist Lewis H. Morgan publishes Ancient Society, linking social progress with technological change.

Mathematics
 Georg Cantor advances the continuum hypothesis.

Medicine
 October 2 – Berlin urologist Maximilian Nitze and Viennese instrument-maker Josef Leiter introduce the first practical cystourethroscope with an electric light source.
 Adolph Kussmaul first describes dyslexia as "word-blindness".
 William Macewen at the Glasgow Royal Infirmary develops the first bone grafts, and also performs knee surgery using a special instrument (Macewen's osteotome), for the treatment of rickets.
 Patrick Manson studies animal carriers of infectious diseases.

Physics
 Ludwig Boltzmann states the relationship between entropy and probability.

Technology
 March 28 – Frederick Wolseley is granted his first patent for a sheep shearing machine.
 April 30 – French poet Charles Cros describes a method of recording sound, the Paleophone.
 June – Emile Berliner files a patent for a "combined telegraph and telephone" incorporating a microphone. 
 June 20 – Alexander Graham Bell installs the world's first commercial telephone service in Hamilton, Ontario.
 September 4 – Louis Brennan patents the Brennan torpedo.
 October – Emile Berliner files a patent for a telephone with induction coils.
 November 4 – Opening of Gustave Eiffel's Maria Pia Bridge carrying the railway across the Douro into Porto, Portugal.
 November 29 – Thomas Edison first demonstrates his phonograph sound recording machine.
 December 13 – Thomas Edison files a patent for "telephones or speaking-telegraphs" incorporating a microphone.
 Surveyor and inventor George R. Carey of Boston, Massachusetts, creates a selenium telectroscope — a camera that can project a moving image to a distant point, an ancestor of television. Constantin Senlecq of Ardres, France, develops the same idea independently at about the same time.

Publications
 Zeitschrift für Physiologische Chemie is founded by Felix Hoppe-Seyler.

Awards
 Copley Medal: James Dwight Dana
 Wollaston Medal: Robert Mallet

Births
 February 2 – Margarete Zuelzer (died 1944), German microbiologist.
 February 7 – G. H. Hardy (died 1947), English mathematician.
 March 16 – Thomas Wyatt Turner (died 1978), American civil rights activist, biologist and educator; first black person ever to receive a doctorate from Cornell.
 April 5 – Walter Sutton (died 1916), American geneticist and surgeon.
 April 24 – José Ingenieros (died 1925), Argentine polymath.
 June 14 – Ida Maclean, born Ida Smedley (died 1944), English biochemist.
 September 1 – Francis William Aston (died 1945), English chemist, Nobel Prize laureate.
 September 2 – Frederick Soddy (died 1956), English physical chemist.
 September 11 – James Hopwood Jeans (died 1946), English mathematician.
 September 13 – Wilhelm Filchner (died 1957), German explorer.
 October 21 – Oswald Avery (died 1955), Canadian American bacteriologist.
 October 25 – Henry Norris Russell (died 1957), American astronomer.
 November 3 – Rosalie Edge (died 1962), American conservationist.

Deaths
 January 2 – Alexander Bain (born 1810), Scottish inventor.
 January 12 – Wilhelm Friedrich Benedikt Hofmeister (born 1824), German botanist.
 February 8 – Charles Wilkes (born 1798), American navigator.
 May 5 – Joseph Bienaimé Caventou (born 1795), French chemist.
 June 3 – Ludwig von Köchel (born 1800), Austrian musicologist and botanist.
 September 17 – H. Fox Talbot (born 1800), English pioneer of photography.
 September 23 – Urbain Le Verrier (born 1811), French astronomer.
 September 26 – Hermann Günther Grassmann (born 1809), German mathematician.
 Choe Han-gi (born 1803), Korean philosopher of science.

References

 
19th century in science
1870s in science